This article documents the most distant astronomical objects discovered and verified so far, and the time periods in which they were so classified.

For comparisons with the light travel distance of the astronomical objects listed below, the age of the universe since the Big Bang is currently estimated as 13.787±0.020 Gyr.

Distances to remote objects, other than those in nearby galaxies, are nearly always inferred by measuring the cosmological redshift of their light. By their nature, very distant objects tend to be very faint, and these distance determinations are difficult and subject to errors. An important distinction is whether the distance is determined via spectroscopy or using a photometric redshift technique. The former is generally both more precise and also more reliable, in the sense that photometric redshifts are more prone to being wrong due to confusion with lower redshift sources that may have unusual spectra. For that reason, a spectroscopic redshift is conventionally regarded as being necessary for an object's distance to be considered definitely known, whereas photometrically determined redshifts identify "candidate" very distant sources. Here, this distinction is indicated by a "p" subscript for photometric redshifts.

Most distant spectroscopically-confirmed objects

Candidate most distant objects 
Since the beginning of the James Webb Space Telescope's (JWST) science operations in June 2022, numerous distant galaxies far beyond what could be seen by the Hubble Space Telescope (z = 11) have been discovered thanks to the JWST's capability of seeing far into the infrared. Previously in 2012, there were about 50 possible objects z = 8 or farther, and another 100 candidates at z = 7, based on photometric redshift estimates released by the Hubble eXtreme Deep Field (XDF) project from observations made between mid-2002 and December 2012. Some objects included here have been observed spectroscopically, but had only one emission line tentatively detected, and are therefore still considered candidates by researchers.

List of most distant objects by type

Timeline of most distant astronomical object recordholders
Objects in this list were found to be the most distant object at the time of determination of their distance. This is frequently not the same as the date of their discovery.

Distances to astronomical objects may be determined through parallax measurements, use of standard references such as cepheid variables or Type Ia supernovas, or redshift measurement. Spectroscopic redshift measurement is preferred, while photometric redshift measurement is also used to identify candidate high redshift sources. The symbol z represents redshift.

List of objects by year of discovery that turned out to be most distant
This list contains a list of most distant objects by year of discovery of the object, not the determination of its distance. Objects may have been discovered without distance determination, and were found subsequently to be the most distant known at that time. However, object must have been named or described. An object like OJ 287 is ignored even though it was detected as early as 1891 using photographic plates, but ignored until the advent of radiotelescopes.

See also
Age of the universe
List of largest cosmic structures
List of exoplanet extremes
List of astronomical objects

Notes

References 

Most distant
Astronomical objects, most distant